The German DRG Class 95 was a ten-coupled tank locomotive with a 2-10-2 wheel arrangement, which was procured by the Deutsche Reichsbahn (also referred to later as the Deutsche Reichsbahn-Gesellschaft or DRG) in 1922 for hauling heavy goods trains on steep main lines. Because the development of this class was begun by the Prussian state railways, it was designated as the Prussian Class T 20.

History 
The first ten locomotives, built in 1922, were ordered as T 20 Magdeburg 9201–9210 and, because they were at first intended to be grouped into Class 77, were supplied as numbers 77 001 to 77 010. By 1923 they had been renumbered to 95 001–010. A total of 45 locomotives were built by 1924. Their areas of operations included the Sonneberg–Probstzella line, the Spessart ramp, the Franconian Forest Railway, the Geislingen ramp (Geislinger Steige), the Schiefe Ebene and the Rübeland Railway, where they earned their nickname Bergkönigin ('mountain queen').

The locomotives were the most powerful tank engines procured by the DRG. The very high traction load of  enabled it to cope with inclines of up to 70‰ (7%) without needing a rack and its Riggenbach counter-pressure brake ensured that it could brake even heavy loads on a downhill stretch.

Of the 45 examples owned by the Reichsbahn, the Deutsche Bundesbahn took over 14 that, towards the end, were stationed in Aschaffenburg and used as pusher locomotives on the Spessart ramp. They were retired in 1958. Locomotives had also been stabled in Neuenmarkt-Wirsberg until 1952 for duties on the Schiefe Ebene.

31 locomotives ended up in the East German Deutsche Reichsbahn. Of these, 24 were rebuilt to oil-firing between 1971 and 1973 and ten were given a newly designed boiler. From 1970 the oil-fired engines were designated as DR Class 95.0 and the unconverted ones as DR Class 95.1. The last locomotives worked the line from Sonneberg to Eisfeld and were retired in 1981.

Preserved Locomotives 
The following locomotives have been preserved:
 95 009 (photo above left) at Dieringhausen Railway Museum
 95 016 (ex Kamenz locomotive depot) in the German Steam Locomotive Museum at Neuenmarkt-Wirsberg. 
 95 020 on display at the Technikmuseum Speyer. 
 95 027 restored and operating on the Rübeland Railway (as of 27 Nov 2010)
 95 028 in the Bochum-Dahlhausen Railway Museum
At present only 95 027 is operational.

See also
 Prussian state railways
 List of DRG locomotives and railbuses
 List of Prussian locomotives and railbuses

Sources 

 
 
 

T 20
1′E1′ h2t locomotives
Borsig locomotives
Hanomag locomotives
Standard gauge locomotives of Germany
Railway locomotives introduced in 1922
2-10-2T locomotives
Freight locomotives